Austrostipa setacea,  the corkscrew bamboo grass, is found in many areas of inland Australia. Flowering may occur at any time of the year. This is one of the many plants first published by Robert Brown with the type known as "(J.D.) v.v." Appearing in his Prodromus Florae Novae Hollandiae et Insulae Van Diemen in 1810. The specific epithet setacea is derived from Latin, referring to the bristly leaves.

References

External links

setacea
Bunchgrasses of Australasia
Flora of Australia